Durium is a highly durable synthetic resin developed in 1929.  It was used in phonograph records, as well as in the casting process for metallic type and in the aeronautics industry.

Origin
It is a resorcinol-formaldehyde resin, the result of research by Hal T. Beans, professor of chemistry at Columbia University.

Properties
The resin is flexible, tasteless, odorless, fire and waterproof. It is fast-setting, reducing the production cost of items made from it.

Applications
Being resistant to fire and water, the resin was used as a substitute for varnish on aeronautical parts.

It was commercialized by Durium Products Company (renamed Durium Products, Inc., from 1931) as the medium for Hit of the Week records, from 1930 to 1932.  The resin was bonded to a cardboard substrate and, being much lighter than its competitor shellac, was sold at newstands for only 15 cents per disc.

References

Synthetic resins